Adolphus O'Brien was a New Zealand cricketer. He played eight first-class matches for Auckland between 1882 and 1890.

See also
 List of Auckland representative cricketers

References

External links
 

Year of birth missing
Year of death missing
New Zealand cricketers
Auckland cricketers
Place of birth missing